Wedding Night – End of the Song is a 1992 Luxembourgish drama film directed by Pol Cruchten. It was screened in the Un Certain Regard section at the 1992 Cannes Film Festival.

Cast
In alphabetical order
 Peter Cooper
 Pol Cruchten
 Ender Frings - Tony
 Sylvie Gales
 Daisy Garand
 Danièle Gaspard
 Emma Grenier
 Joseph Gudenburg
 Patrick Hastert
 Pol Hoffmann
 Marja-Leena Junker - Catherine's mother
 Sofie Knyff
 Jean-Paul Maes
 André Mergenthaler
 Domenico Miccolis
 Myriam Muller - Catherine
 Paul Scheuer - Catherine's father
 Isabelle Thill
 Guido Tomassini
 Thierry van Werveke - Christian
 Marie-Paule von Roesgen - Christian's mother

References

External links

1992 films
Luxembourgish-language films
1992 drama films
Films directed by Pol Cruchten
Luxembourgian drama films